Norris is an unincorporated community in Mellette County, South Dakota, United States, which is not specifically tracked by the Census Bureau, but rather is only included in the census-designated place of the same name. The population of the CDP was 150 at the 2020 census.  Norris has the post office which serves the 57560 ZIP code area, which also includes the town of Corn Creek.

Norris was laid out in 1910, and named after a nephew of the town's merchant.

Demographics

References

Census-designated places in Mellette County, South Dakota
Census-designated places in South Dakota